Thomas Horton M.D. is a fictional character on the NBC soap opera Days of Our Lives. The role was portrayed by John Lupton from July 10, 1967, to May 3, 1971, December 23, 1971, to July 3, 1972, May 9 to 11, 1973, October 24, 1975, to April 27, 1978, and finally from December 22, 1978, to March 7, 1980.

Storylines
Thomas Horton Jr. is the eldest son of Dr. Tom Horton Sr. and his wife Alice. He is Addie Horton's twin, born in 1931 and affectionately called "Tommy." Before the series begins in 1965, Tommy had married a woman named Kitty and had a daughter with her named Sandy. However, Tommy is subsequently presumed dead in the Korean War in 1953.

In 1967, Tom and Alice's youngest son Bill Horton returns to Salem with a man named Dr. Mark Brooks. Mark is hired at Salem University Hospital, and Bill's sister Marie becomes Mark's research assistant. Mark and Marie begin a relationship, but the Hortons soon begin to sense something strange and familiar about Mark. Dr. Tom Horton Sr. and his son Mickey mount an investigation into Mark's past which reveals that Mark is in fact Tommy. Disfigured in the war, an amnesiac Tommy had been held as a prisoner of war until he had saved the life of a Soviet soldier, for which he had been rewarded by reconstructive surgery to his face. When Tommy/Mark and Marie learn that they are brother and sister, a devastated Marie leaves town to become a nun.

Tommy tries to get to know his daughter Sandy, and wants to reconcile with Kitty. But Kitty is now pursuing Dr. Elliot Kincaid, and unhappy to be suddenly trapped in a marriage to Tommy. He confronts Kitty, who fakes chest pains to avoid his questions; Tommy soon discovers that Kitty has had numerous affairs, and realizes that their marriage is a lost cause. They divorce in 1969. In 1977, Tommy proposes to Linda Paterson, who initially accepts but later breaks things off to marry Bob Anderson. Tommy leaves Salem for good in 1979, returning only once, for Tom and Alice's fiftieth wedding anniversary in March 1980.

While he does not return for several important family occasions, including the deaths of his father in 1994 and mother and brother Mickey in 2010, his nieces Julie (Susan Seaforth Hayes) and Jennifer (Melissa Reeves) reveal that he is still alive as of 2016.

External links
Tom Horton, Jr. at SoapCentral.com

Days of Our Lives characters
Fictional twins
Fictional physicians
Television characters introduced in 1967
Male characters in television
Fictional characters incorrectly presumed dead
Horton family